The 1989 Supertaça Cândido de Oliveira was the 11th edition of the Supertaça Cândido de Oliveira, the annual Portuguese football season-opening match contested by the winners of the previous season's top league and cup competitions (or cup runner-up in case the league- and cup-winning club is the same). The 1989 Supertaça Cândido de Oliveira was contested over two legs, and opposed Belenenses and Benfica of the Primeira Liga. Benfica qualified for the SuperCup by winning the 1988–89 Primeira Divisão, whilst Belenenses qualified for the Supertaça by winning the 1988–89 Taça de Portugal.

The first leg which took place at the Estádio da Luz, saw Benfica defeat Belenenses 2–0. The second leg which took place at the Estádio do Restelo saw Benfica defeat Belenenses 2–0 (4–0 on aggregate), which claimed the Encarnados a third Supertaça.

First leg

Details

Second leg

Details

References

Supertaça Cândido de Oliveira
1989–90 in Portuguese football
S.L. Benfica matches
C.F. Os Belenenses matches